Xiombarg plaumanni is a species of goblin spider occurring in southeastern Brazil and adjacent Argentina. It is the only species in the genus Xiombarg.  Italian arachnologist Paolo Marcello Brignoli described X. plaumanni in 1979, naming the genus after Xiombarg, a character in Michael Moorcock novels.

References

Oonopidae
Spiders of Argentina
Spiders of Brazil
Spiders described in 1979